The Minnesota Legislature is the bicameral legislature of the U.S. state of Minnesota consisting of two houses: the Senate and the House of Representatives. Senators are elected from 67 single-member districts. In order to account for decennial redistricting, members run for one two-year term and two four-year terms each decade. They are elected for four-year terms in years ending in 2 and 6, and for two-year terms in years ending in 0. Representatives are elected for two-year terms from 134 single-member districts formed by dividing the 67 senate districts in half.

Both houses of the Legislature meet between January and the first Monday following the third Saturday in May each year, not to exceed 120 legislative days per biennium. Floor sessions are held in the Minnesota State Capitol in Saint Paul.

History
Early on in the Minnesota's history, the Legislature had direct control over the city charters that set the groundwork for governments in municipalities across the state. In the early period, many laws were written for specific cities. The practice was outlawed in 1881, though attempts were still made. For instance, the long-standing Minneapolis Park and Recreation Board and the city's now defunct Library Board were both created by the Legislature in the next several years. The Minnesota Constitution was amended in 1896 to give cities direct control over their own charters.

Following the ratification of the Nineteenth Amendment to the United States Constitution in 1920, women began to be elected to the Minnesota Legislature. In 1922, Mabeth Hurd Paige, Hannah Kempfer, Sue Metzger Dickey Hough and Myrtle Cain were elected to the Minnesota House of Representatives.

In 1984, the Legislature ordered that all gender-specific pronouns be removed from the state laws. After two years of work, the rewritten laws were adopted. Only 301 of 20,000 pronouns were feminine. "His" was changed 10,000 times and "he" was changed 6,000 times.

The non-partisan era
In 1913, Minnesota legislators began to be elected on nonpartisan ballots. This was a historical accident that occurred when a bill to provide for no-party elections of judges, city, and county officers was amended to include the Legislature in the belief that it would kill the bill. While Minnesota legislators were elected on a nonpartisan ballot, they caucused as "Liberals" or "Conservatives," roughly the equivalent in most years to Democratic or Farmer–Labor (later Democratic–Farmer–Labor) and Republican, respectively. In 1974, House members again ran with party designation. In 1976, Senate members again ran with party designation.

Recent history
Governor Jesse Ventura advocated the idea of changing the Legislature to be unicameral while he was in office, but the concept did not obtain widespread support.

In 2004, the Legislature ended its regular session without acting on a majority of the planned legislation, largely due to political divisiveness on a variety of issues ranging from education to same-sex marriage (See same-sex marriage in the United States for related events during the year). A proper budget failed to pass, and major anticipated projects such as the Northstar Corridor commuter rail line were not approved. Governor Tim Pawlenty, an opponent turned advocate of the line, was expected to request a special session but ended up helping the coordination of other funds to continue the development of the line. The lack of action in the 2004 session is said to be one reason why a number of Republican House members lost their seats in the November election. The Democratic–Farmer–Labor (DFL) minority grew from 53 to 66 and the Republican majority was reduced from 81 to 68.

The Senate was not up for election in 2004 so the DFL was able to maintain its five-seat majority in the upper house. One state senator, Sheila Kiscaden of Rochester, was an Independence Party member until December 2005 when she began caucusing with the DFL, although she had been an elected Republican in the past. The DFL majority increased to six senators when Kiscaden announced her re-affiliation with the DFL in preparation to run for lieutenant governor on a ticket with DFLer Kelly Doran.

There is a mandatory adjournment date specified in the state constitution: "The legislature shall not meet in regular session, nor in any adjournment thereof, after the first Monday following the third Saturday in May of any year." In 2005, the regular session ended without passage of an overall budget and a special session was subsequently called by Governor Pawlenty. No overall budget passed by the end of the fiscal year on June 30, and much of the government shut down for the first time in the state's history. However, some essential services remained in operation and some departments received funding in legislation. A compromise budget was approved and signed into law two weeks later.

Television broadcasts
When the Legislature is in session, proceedings of both houses are broadcast on television via the Minnesota Channel and also online via the Legislature's website.

Gallery

See also
 Minnesota Senate
 Minnesota House of Representatives
 Minnesota Territorial Legislature

Notes

References

External links
 Minnesota Legislature
 Minnesota Senate
 Minnesota House of Representatives

 
Legislature
Bicameral legislatures